Golberg is a surname. Notable people with the surname include:

Aleksandr Golberg (1879–1919), Russian anarchist politician
Argo Golberg (born 1982), Estonian runner
Mécislas Golberg (1869–1907), Polish French philosopher and anarchist
Pål Golberg (born 1990), Norwegian cross country skier

See also
Colberg
Goldberg (surname)